Ust-Kan (Ust'-Kan; , Kan-Oozı; , Qan) is a rural locality (a selo) and the administrative center of Ust-Kansky District of the Altai Republic, Russia. Population:

References

Notes

Sources

Rural localities in Ust-Kansky District